Šmihel pri Novem Mestu is a former village in southeastern Slovenia in the City Municipality of Novo Mesto. It was annexed by the city of Novo Mesto in 1979, ending its existence as an independent settlement.

Name
The name Šmihel is derived from *šent Mihael 'Saint Michael' (via *Šm̩mihel) and refers to the parish church in the settlement. The name of the village was changed from Šmihel to Šmihel pri Novem mestu in 1952.

References

External links
Šmihel pri Novem Mestu on Geopedia

Populated places in the City Municipality of Novo Mesto
Former settlements in Slovenia